Julias Moon is a Danish electro pop duo based in Copenhagen. Originally launched in 2013 as a trio with Nicolai Gabold, the band’s sound later became defined by the songwriting and production duo of Oliver Kincaid and Louis Samson, creating a characteristic streamlined song format with the focus on strong melodic hooks and notable use of falsetto vocals. The band achieved considerable success with their hit singles "Bay" in 2013, and the follow-ups "Lipstick Lies", "Palace” and ”Camera”. These all charted in tracklisten, the official Danish Singles Chart. After extensive touring with a live band including Felix Ewert on drums and Nicholas Kincaid on bass, the duo shocked fans by deciding to split up in 2016 at the height of their success. The sheer intensity of their rapid rise to success in Denmark was later cited by the band as the reason for quitting. What was intended as a permanent break changed, however, after Oliver and Louis got together in late 2019 and decided to collaborate in the studio ”for old time’s sake”. During the Covid-19 lockdown, they spent time in a family cottage in the woods and re-kindled a creative chemistry that lead to the writing of new material. Julias Moon officially relaunched the band on October 9, 2020 with a new single ”Drive”. The group is currently signed to the record label Copenhagen Records, distributed by Universal Music.

History
The group debuted with their single "Bay" in October 2013 where it was picked as "Ugens Uundgåelige" at the Danish radio station P3. The same single was later nominated at P3's annual award show for the listener hit of the year and the Talent Award.

In March 2014 the single "Lipstick Lies" was released. It fared well on the airplay charts and was featured on MTV Holland and Belgium. The group played shows all over Denmark the following summer.

In October 2014 their third and latest single "Palace" was released followed on November 7 by their EP "Fake ID Heartbreak".

Members
The members are:
Louis Samson - vocalist and songwriter
Oliver Kincaid - songwriter, producer

On stage, the duo is joined by:
Thorval Naur - keyboards, vocals
Felix Ewert - drums
Zacharias Celinder, bass, guitar (-2016)
Nicholas Kincaid, bass and keyboard

Discography

EPs

Singles

References

External links
Official website
Facebook

Danish pop music groups
Electropop groups